Josef Wanetschek (born 31 December 1933) is an Austrian fencer. He competed in the individual and team sabre events at the 1960 Summer Olympics.

References

External links
 

1933 births
Living people
Austrian male sabre fencers
Olympic fencers of Austria
Fencers at the 1960 Summer Olympics
Fencers from Vienna